was a town located in Senboku District, Akita Prefecture, Japan.

In 2003, the town had an estimated population of 8,948 and a density of 36.12 persons per km2. The total area was 247.74 km2.

On March 22, 2005, Kyōwa, along with the city of Ōmagari; the towns of Kamioka, Nakasen, Nishisenboku, Ōta and Semboku; and the village of Nangai (all from Senboku District), merged to create the city of Daisen.

Noted people from Kyowa
 Hitoshi Okuda

External links 
 Daisen official website 

Dissolved municipalities of Akita Prefecture
Daisen, Akita